Dinnie Block was a property in Grand Forks, North Dakota.  It was removed from the National Register of Historic Places in 2004.

Along with Wright Block, the Telephone Co. Building, the Clifford Annex, and Golden Square, the Dinnie Block was one of many "commercial vernacular brick buildings with classical revival details" that were built during a major building boom, with high quality brickwork.  The Dinnie Block was built in 1907.

The National Register listing covered Early Commercial, "Vernacular-Classical ornamen"(tation?), and Other architecture.  The listing was for an area of less than one acre with just one contributing building.

Its listing status is RN, which means removed from National Register.

See also 
 1997 Red River flood in the United States

References

Former National Register of Historic Places in North Dakota
Buildings designated early commercial in the National Register of Historic Places in North Dakota
Vernacular architecture in North Dakota
Buildings and structures completed in 1907
National Register of Historic Places in Grand Forks, North Dakota
1907 establishments in North Dakota
1997 disestablishments in North Dakota
Buildings and structures destroyed by flooding